The 1997 FIA GT Hockenheim 4 Hours was the inaugural race of the FIA GT Championship, which had replaced the former BPR Global GT Series in 1997.  It was run at the Hockenheimring on April 13, 1997.

Official results
Class winners in bold.  Cars failing to complete 75% of winner's distance marked as Not Classified (NC).

Statistics
 Pole Position – #11 AMG-Mercedes – 1:59.099
 Fastest Lap – #8 BMW Motorsport – 2:01.711
 Average Speed – 191.756 km/h
 Distance – 770.999 km

References

External links
 World Sports Prototype Racing – Race Results

H
Hockenheim 4 Hours
FIA GT Hockenheim 4 Hours